United Nations Security Council Resolution 402, adopted on May 25, 1977, after recalling Resolution 402 (1976), the Council noted with concern the continued harassment of the people of Lesotho by South Africa in violation of the resolution. It also recognised the burden that had been placed upon Lesotho with regard to its decision not to recognise the "independent" bantustan Transkei by South Africa.

The Council commended the Government of Lesotho for its decision not to recognise Transkei, and endorsed the report by the Mission to Lesotho and the Secretary-General Kurt Waldheim's call for international assistance to Lesotho. The Resolution also called upon the Secretary-General to continue to monitor the situation and report back any developments.

The resolution was adopted without a vote.

See also
 List of United Nations Security Council Resolutions 401 to 500 (1976–1982)
 South Africa under apartheid

References
Text of the Resolution at undocs.org

External links
 

 0407
Transkei
United Nations Security Council Resolution 407
 0407
 0407
May 1977 events
Lesotho–South Africa relations